Kim Jong Grillin is a Korean restaurant in Portland, Oregon. The business operates from southeast Portland's Richmond neighborhood, as of 2022, and plans to expand with a stall in the food hall at Block 216.

Description
Kim Jong Grillin' serves Korean cuisine, including bulgogi, galbi, and japchae.

History

Kim Jong Grillin' is owned by chef Han Ly Hwang. The food cart caught fire in 2011. The business began operating again in 2014.

According to Chad Walsh of Eater Portland, the restaurant sold 60–80 pounds of short ribs, 130 pounds of bulgogi, 470–500 pounds of meat, and 250 pounds of kimchi per week, as of mid 2016. In June 2016, the business confirmed plans to close on Alberta and collaborate with Matt's BBQ. The restaurant was burglarized in December 2016.

In 2017, Hwang confirmed plans to open Kim Jong Grillin' Ssam at Cartopia, a food cart pod in southeast Portland.

In 2020, during the COVID-19 pandemic, the restaurant served free meals to unemployed restaurant workers. The business plans to operate a stall in the food hall at Block 216, as of 2023.

Reception
In 2016, Eater Portland described the restaurant as "enormously popular". The restaurant was named in multiple Eater Portland lists in 2021, including Nick Townsend's "15 Restaurants Worth Visiting on SE Division", Nick Woo and Brooke Jackson-Glidden's "15 Outstanding Portland Food Carts", and Jackson-Glidden's "The 38 Essential Restaurants and Food Carts in Portland". Katherine Chew Hamilton and Nick Campigli included the restaurant in Portland Monthly 2021 list of 7 "must-try hot dog hotspots", writing: "The KJG hot dog is a must-have if you're looking for mild heat and Korean American flair. The spicy daikon, kimchi mayo, and pickled mango are excellent additions to the longstanding American tradition of putting meat (in this case, Zenner's sausage) inside a bun."

See also

 History of Korean Americans in Portland, Oregon
 List of food trucks
 List of Korean restaurants

References

External links

 
 Kim Jong Grillin' at Zomato

Asian restaurants in Portland, Oregon
Food carts in Portland, Oregon
Food trucks
Korean restaurants in the United States
Korean-American culture in Portland, Oregon
Richmond, Portland, Oregon